Lingvo Internacia (English: International Language) was an Esperanto periodical, published from 1895 to 1914. It was the second Esperanto periodical, following La Esperantisto (1889–1895). Lingvo Internacia was the central Esperanto publication in the years leading up to World War I, accompanied by La Revuo (1906–1914).

See also
 History of Esperanto
 List of Esperanto periodicals

Notes

References

 

Esperanto
Esperanto publications
Esperanto magazines